Zelmar Casco (31 July 1926 – 5 September 2020) was an Argentine fencer. He competed in the individual and team épée events at the 1964 Summer Olympics.

References

External links
 

1926 births
2020 deaths
Argentine male fencers
Argentine épée fencers
Olympic fencers of Argentina
Fencers at the 1964 Summer Olympics
Sportspeople from La Plata